Wilshire/La Brea is an under-construction, underground rapid transit (known locally as a subway) station on the D Line of the Los Angeles Metro Rail system. It is slated to open in 2024. It will be served by the D Line and will be the first station on that line west of Wilshire/Western station.

Station layout 
Currently under construction with a completion date of 2024. The station box dig out is completed. TBM's were launched here dug a tunnel east to Wilshire/Western station, then returned and launched west to Wilshire/Fairfax station.

One of two possible transfer stations with the Crenshaw Northern Extension Rail Project line to the Hollywood district are under study, the other being Wilshire/Fairfax station.

Attractions 
El Rey Theater
Maurice and Paul Marciano Art Foundation
Consulate of Spain
Spanish Broadcasting System
SAG-AFTRA Foundation

References 

Future Los Angeles Metro Rail stations
Railway stations scheduled to open in 2024
D Line (Los Angeles Metro)
Wilshire, Los Angeles
Wilshire Boulevard